Wiehlenarius boreus is a species of Araneomorph spider in the Linyphiidae family.

The species is endemic to Russia. It is known from Siberia.

References 

Linyphiidae
Fauna of Russia